Gandhar is the 3rd svara from the seven svaras of Hindustani music and Carnatic music. Gandhar is the long form of the syllable ग. For simplicity in pronouncing while singing the syllable, Gandhar is pronounced as Ga (notation - G). It is also called as गान्धार or गंधार in the Devanagri script.

Details
The following is the information about Gandhar and its importance in Indian classical music :

 Gandhar is the third svara in an octave or Saptak.
 Gandhar is the immediate next svara of Rishabh (Re).
 The svara of Gandhar is  Komal and Shuddha.
 It is said that Shadja is the basic svara from which all the other 6 svaras are produced. When we break the word Shadja then we get, Shad And Ja. It means that Shad is 6 and ja is 'giving birth' in Marathi. So basically the translation is :
  षड् - 6, ज -जन्म . Therefore, it collectively means giving birth to the other 6 notes of the music.
So the svara Ga is formed from Shadja.
 The frequency of Gandhar is 300 Hz. The frequencies of the 7 svaras are also given below: Sa 240 Hz, Re 270 Hz, Ga 300 Hz, Ma 320 Hz, Pa 360 Hz, Dha 400 Hz, and Ni 450 Hz, Sa 480 Hz (Taar Saptak) ........ (and so on).
Consequently, the Ga after the Re of 540 Hz (Taar Saptak) has a frequency of 600 Hz i.e. the double of the Lower octave Ga.
 There are  Shruti's of Gandhar. Previously the main Shruti, not only for Ga but for all the other svaras, was on the last Shruti but now it is considered to be on the 1st Shurti.
For example, if these are the 2 Shruti's of Ga then,

                  Previously this was the position of the main Shruti of Ga.
                  ^ 
              1   2
              ^
              But now this position has become the main Shruti of Ga.
 All the other svaras except Shadja (Sa) and Pancham (Pa) can be  or  but Sa and Pa are always Shuddha svaras. And hence svaras Sa and Pa are called Achal Svaras , since these svaras don't move from their original position. Svaras Ra, Ga, Ma, Dha, Ni are called Chal Svaras, since these svaras move from their original position.
    
     Sa, Re, Ga, Ma, Pa, Dha, Ni - Shuddha Svaras
    
     Re, Ga, Dha, Ni - Komal Svaras 
   
     Ma - 
 Ragas from Kafi Thaat, Asavari Thaat, Todi Thaat and Bhairavi Thaat have Komal Gandhar, rest of the thaats have Shuddha Gandhar.
 Ragas where Ga is the Vadi svara - Raga Kafi (raga), raga Bageshri, raga Bhoopali etc. Ragas where Ga is the Samvadi svara - Raga Sohni, etc.
 Hypothetically speaking, Ga is said to be the Gandharvas, Gandharvas as in, the three main gods, Bhrama, Vishnu and Shiva were first created i.e. Sakar Bhrama (Sa) and then these three gods created Rishimuni i.e. Re and then Gandharvas were created for singing. Ga is made the acronym of Gandharvas for showing the importance of the syllable Ga.
 Gandhar is said to be sourced from the bleating of a goat.
 Gandhar is associated with the planet Sun.
 Gandhar is associated with Golden colour.

See also
 List of Ragas in Hindustani classical music
 Svara
 Shadja (Sa)
 Rishabh (Re)
 Madhyam (Ma)
 Pancham (Pa)
 Dhaivat (Dha)
 Nishad (Ni)

Ga (svara)

References

Indian classical music
Musical notation
Musical scales
Hindustani music terminology
Carnatic music terminology